Qingdao University of Science and Technology F.C. (Simplified Chinese: 青岛青科足球俱乐部) are a professional football club based in Qingdao, Shandong in China where they play their home games in the Qingdao Hushan Stadium. The club was founded in 2005 by the Qingdao University of Science and Technology as an amateur college football team before turning professional in 2009 when they gained sponsorship and joined the bottom of the Chinese pyramid by playing in the Chinese Yi League.

History
The club was founded in 2005 by the Qingdao University of Science and Technology as an amateur college football team named Qingdao Haizhiying F.C., where they played in the local university and regional league system. After gaining some significant success within these leagues, the club would gain interest from some sponsors and produce enough funds for the 3 million Yuan required to turn professional and enter the bottom of the Chinese pyramid by playing in the Chinese Yi League, and renaming itself Qingdao University of Science and Technology F.C.. The club's debut season in the 2009 Chinese League Two was, however, a huge disappointment- and the club finished rock-bottom within their division. This saw the club decide to remain absent in the 2010 league season and return to their regional league, however the club would return to professional football in 2011.

Name changes
2005–2008 Qingdao Haizhiying F.C. 青岛海之鹰
2009– Qingdao University of Science and Technology F.C. 青岛青科

See also
Qingdao University of Science and Technology

References

External links
 https://web.archive.org/web/20070528163826/http://www.liming-football.com/

Football clubs in China
Sport in Qingdao
2005 establishments in China
Association football clubs established in 2005